The 200th Airlift Squadron (200 AS) is an inactive unit of the Colorado Air National Guard 140th Wing located at Peterson Air Force Base, Colorado Springs, Colorado. The 200th was last equipped with the C-21A Learjet.

Overview
The 200th Airlift Squadron (AS) provided secure priority airlift from 1946 to 2018 for the highest level of military and civilian leaders throughout the world.

History
Established with the assignment of the C-47 Skytrain to Buckley Field Base Operations section in 1946. The C-47 was the original "Flintstone Airlines".  The C-54 Skymaster (Flintstone II) replaced the C-47 in 1966. Flintstone I and II provided airlift for state emergencies, unit deployments and general requirements of both the Colorado Army and Air National Guard.  The C-131 Samaritan eventually replaced the C-54 and Buckley Base Operations controlled both the C-131 and Cessna O-2 Skymaster aircraft. In 1979 two Boeing T-43A Bobcats arrived at Buckley and replaced the C-131 and O-2s.

The unit was renamed Operating Location AA (OL-AA) and T-43s served as flying classrooms in support of the U.S. Air Force Academy (USAFA) 50th Airmanship Training Squadron Airmanship Program from 1979 through 1997. On 1 July 1983, while under the command of Lt. Col. Mel Walden, the unit separated from other base operations functions and was re-designated Operating Location BB (OL-BB).

In October 1985 the unit received two CT-43As configured for passenger airlift, augmenting and expanding into a dual Operational Support Aircraft (OSA) supporting VIP missions. In addition to the USAFA Airmanship Program, the unit flew worldwide airlift missions supporting many dignitaries including the Prime Minister of the United Kingdom, U.S. cabinet members, congressmen, ambassadors, and the Chief of Staff of the Air Force. Added two additional CT-43As in 1981.  In January 1986, Lt. Col. Ron Germano took command and the unit was designated Detachment One, Headquarters Colorado Air National Guard (Det-1, COANG).  Transferred CT-43s to other organizations in 1991.

In June 1992 the unit was designated the 200th Airlift Squadron (AS) and in November 1997, it received the first of two C-21A aircraft; T-43As to Randolph AFB in 1997.  Replaced with C-26B turboprops in 1996.  Lt. Col. Scott Schofield took command on 6 March 1999 at Buckley Air National Guard Base, and the 200th AS moved to Peterson AFB in April 1999 near USAFA in Colorado Springs.

After the 11 September 2001 attacks, the squadron transported emergency responders to New York and Washington D.C., and began a new mission as target aircraft for NORAD air defense exercises. The 200th AS also supported USNORTHCOM disaster relief missions after hurricanes Katrina and Rita in 2005.

On 23 March 2006, an inter-fly agreement with the active-duty 311th Airlift Squadron was signed and the 375th Operations Group began Total Force Operations. With the inter-fly agreement, the two squadrons share jets, pilots, and deployments.

In February 2010, the 200 AS participated in its first combat deployment, sending six crewmembers to the CENTCOM AOR in support of Operations IRAQI FREEDOM and ENDURING FREEDOM. Since then, several more 200 AS crewmembers have deployed and the unit continues to support and augment the active duty in-theater mission.

After a long and decorated history, the 200th held a formal deactivation ceremony Oct. 14, 2018, presided over by Gov. John Hickenlooper on Buckley AFB, Aurora, Colorado. Prior to the official deactivation in June 2018, the 200th has won Joint Operational Support Airlift Center small unit award seven years in a row.

The U.S. Air Force transferred one of the aircraft to Andrews AFB, with the other transferring to Scott AFB for the C-21 enterprise consolidation.

Lineage
 Constituted as the 200th Airlift Squadron on 16 March 1992
 Activated on 1 June 1992
 Inactivated c. 1 June 2018

Assignments
 140th Fighter Wing, 1 June 1992
 140th Operations Group, 1 October 1995 – c. 1 June 2018

Stations
 Buckley Air National Guard Base, Colorado, 1 June 1992
 Peterson Air Force Base, Colorado, 1 October 1997 – June 2018

Aircraft
 Boeing T-43A, 1992-1997
 Fairchild C-26B Metroliner,  1996-1997
 C-21A Learjet, 1997–present

References

  200th Airlift Squadron History
 Rogers, B. (2006). United States Air Force Unit Designations Since 1978.
Unit deactivation article: 140th Wing bids final farewell to 200th Airlift Squadron

External links

Squadrons of the United States Air National Guard
200
Military units and formations in Colorado
Military units and formations established in 1992